Grovatnet is a lake that lies in the municipality of Sørfold in Nordland county, Norway.

See also
 List of lakes in Norway
 Geography of Norway

References

Sørfold
Lakes of Nordland